André Forker (born 31 July 1979) is a German luger who competed from 1998 to 2007. He won the silver medal in the men's doubles event at the 2006 FIL European Luge Championships in Winterberg, Germany.

References
Associated Press profile: Andre Forker
FIL-Luge profile: Forker, Andre
List of European luge champions

External links
 

1979 births
Living people
German male lugers